Asian School of Business is an AICTE ( All India Council for Technical Education) approved business school located in Technocity West, Pallipuram,  Trivandrum, Kerala. India. The institution was established in 2005.

Its aim is to facilitate and promote studies and research with a focus on professional education. The flagship programme of Asian School of Business (ASB) was the "Postgraduate Diploma in Management" (PGDM). The IIM Bill 2017 permitted the IIMs to change the nomenclature of their two-year Post Graduate Programme from PGDM to MBA. Asian School of Business also decided to change the nomenclature and approached the Cochin University of Science and Technology (CUSAT) Kochi for recognition of the programme. In April 2019, the University approved the request and Asian School of Business started to offer the MBA programme with the degree being conferred by CUSAT.

The programme combines the rigour of the CUSAT MBA and the industry orientation of the earlier PGDM programme. Specializations are offered in the domains of marketing, finance, human resources and operations. Admission to these programmes is through a Common Entrance Test followed by group discussion and interview. As per the directives of the Admission Supervisory Council appointed by the Government of Kerala, the accepted entrance tests are CAT, CMAT and KMAT. The Two Year Full-Time MBA programme is also approved by the AICTE, New Delhi.

Academics
In addition to the full-time MBA programme, Asian School of Business also offers short-term Management Development programmes that are tailor-made to the requirements of specific companies.

In July 2011, Business Digest recognized ASB as No. 2 among private business schools in Kerala.

Postgraduate Diploma in Management

The objective of the two-year, full-time MBA programme is to develop young men and women into leaders and competent professional managers. The course comprises two components: the core programme in the first year and the elective programme in the second year. The elective courses which are offered in the second year of the programme allow students to choose a bouquet of courses that interest them and develop proficiency in the areas of their choice. The MBA is designed for candidates with substantive work experience and for fresh graduates.

Management Development programmes
ASB offers education programmes aimed at corporates. As an example, more than 100 executives of IBS Software attended a two-month-long MDP of Asian School of Business.

Open programmes
In addition to custom MDPs designed for a specific organization, ASB also offers Open Programs, which are short MDPs open to any professional, who desires to improve their knowledge base in areas such as finance, marketing, strategy or operations.

Industry support
ASB enjoys the benefit of guidance from a Board of Governors, comprising professionals and academics, in India and abroad. They include Dr.Subramaniam Ramadorai former CEO of Tata Consultancy Services and advisor to the Prime Minister of India in the National Council on Skill Development, government of India; Professor Samuel Paul, former Director, IIM Ahmedabad and Advisor to the World Bank, Professor Prakash Apte, former Director Indian Institute of Management Bangalore; Mr. Arun Kumar, Board Member, KPMG Mr. George M. Thomas, Patron, ASB; Mr. Vijaya Raghavan, Founder-CEO, Technopark.

ASB Campus

The Asian School Of Business started operations from the Padbhanamam building  Technopark in Kerala. In 2011, the school shifted to its own new campus.ty. This is one of India's first academic campuses to be a LEED-certified Green Building complex and campus situated at Pallipuram

A large, well-stocked library  provides the place to research management literature and data. Asian School of Business library is an integral part of the learning resources at Asian School of Business. Library has a wide collection of contemporary management learning resources like Text books, Reference books, Journals, Popular Magazines, Newspapers, CDs/DVDs, Case Studies, Reports etc. The complete catalogue of the library is made available using Open Source Library Management Software Koha and can be accessed online. The classrooms, library, faculty areas and other public areas are air-conditioned for comfort.

There are three blocks: the academic block, the library block, and the hostel block. The library block was completed in December 2012. The library block hosts not only the library, but also the kitchen, dining areas, a gymnasium and other recreational facilities. The academic block includes the classrooms, including a Seminar Hall with a seating capacity of 300 and two classrooms with a capacity of 75. The hostel block includes separate floors for men and women, and is electronically access-controlled. The rooms, unlike in many other business schools, have attached bathrooms in addition to standard furniture. There is a concierge service that provides linen changes and room cleaning.

CPG Consultants - the architects of National University of Singapore, Nanyang Technological University, Singapore Changi Airport and Ahmedabad International Airport among others were hired to set up ASB's ₹ 63 crore campus in Trivandrum .

The late Mr. MNV Nair was the Professor Emeritus and Prof. S Jagadish was the first Director of the school.

In February 2012, DNA & Stars of Industry Group honored ASB with an award for B-Schools who innovate in teaching methodology.

Several of the full-time faculties are from various IIMs and other top rated  Management institutions  with over 20–30 years of professional experience in business and academics.

ASB attracts visiting faculty for key subjects, most of them alumni of IIM.

Director's List

 Prof. Jagadish S (2005-2008)
 Prof. Ramakrishanan K (2008-2011)
 Prof. Rajeev S (2011-2014)
 Prof. Nagabrhamam D (2014-2016)
 Prof. Aby Abraham  (2016-2017)
 Dr. George Thomas (2017-2018)
 Dr.(Col) P.S James (2018-)

International networking 
ASB has exchange programs with University of Kansas School of Business. ASB has ready forged a string of tie-ups with universities like Instytut Organizacji i Zarzadzania W Przemysle (Institute of Organization and Management in Industry) (ORGMASZ) of Warsaw in Poland.

ASB has also signed other agreements with European Universities and are in discussion with others in South Korea.

ASB has held international seminars with invited guest faculty from, among others, Stanford Centre for International Development (SGID), Yale University, University of Rhode Island, and Northeastern University.

Clubs and interest groups
 Srishti - The Retail club

References

The Hindu - ASB AICTE approval
Official website of Asian School of Business
Business school being set up at Technopark, The Hindu, 22 April 2005
 Management school coming up at Thiruvananthapuram, The Hindu - Business Line, 22 April 2005
 ASB eyeing the top slot, The Hindu, 5 July 2005
NRI to set up a Rs 300m B-school in Kerala, The Times of India, 22 April 2005
Kerala's Asian School of Business set to open, Yahoo! India News, 23 August 2005
Kerala business school reserves seats for NRIs, India eNews.com, 13 June 2006
 World-class B-school soon, Industrial Economist

Business schools in Thiruvananthapuram
Educational institutions established in 2005
2005 establishments in Kerala